Daniel John Erlandsson (born 22 May 1976) is a Swedish musician, best known as the drummer in the melodic death metal band Arch Enemy and Brujeria.

His early work includes drumming on the In Flames album Subterranean (1995). He has also played for other bands, most notably Eucharist, Liers in Wait, Diabolique, Armageddon (featuring Christopher Amott of Arch Enemy), Revengia and The End.

Erlandsson was born in Malmö. His older brother is Adrian Erlandsson, the drummer of At the Gates, The Haunted, Brujeria, Paradise Lost and Vallenfyre and the former drummer of Cradle of Filth. They both grew up together in Sweden and started playing drums at a very young age. Daniel writes on the Arch Enemy website: "We grew up together and used to jam on a little kit in our parents basement, he started first and after some years I started too... He's been a great influence over the years, and if it wasn't for him I probably wouldn't be playing today."

He formerly played reunion shows with legendary grindcore band Carcass from 2007–2010 as their original drummer Ken Owen could not play due to complications from a brain hemorrhage he had in 1999. Both he and fellow Arch Enemy member Michael Amott left the band in 2012, with Erlandsson being replaced by former Aborted and current Trigger the Bloodshed drummer Daniel Wilding.

In 2012, he was hired by the band Brujeria, under the name "El Clavador".

Equipment 
Pearl Reference Pure Drums (Ivory Pearl #330)

 22x18 bass drum (x2)
 10x8 tom
 12x9 tom
 13x10 tom
 16x16 floor tom
 18x16 floor tom
 20x14 gong drum
 14x5.5 Daniel Erlandsson signature snare drum

()

Pearl ICON rack system and hardware

 DR-503 ICON rack
 DR-501 front rack
 RJ-50 mini extension bar
 PCX-200 rack clamp (x4)
 PCX-100 rack clamp (x11)
 CH-2030 boom arm (x11)
 H-2000 hi hat stand
 P-3000 bass drum pedal (x2)
 S-1030 snare drum stand
 TH-1030i tom holder (x4)
 CLH-930 closed hi hat arm
 D-2500 drum throne

References

External links 

  Daniel Erlandsson's profile on Evans
  Daniel Erlandsson's profile on Pearl Drums
  Daniel Erlandsson's list of cymbals on Drumhall.com
 Brazilian Arch Enemy fan site

Death metal musicians
Swedish heavy metal drummers
Swedish people of Romanian descent
Arch Enemy members
Carcass (band) members
1976 births
Living people
Musicians from Malmö
21st-century drummers
In Flames members
Liers in Wait members